Özgür Gürbulak (born 30 April 1981) is a Turkish wheelchair basketball player and Paralympian. He is a 4 point player competing for Galatasaray Wheelchair Basketball, and is part of Turkey men's national wheelchair basketball team.

Özgür played in the national team, which qualified to the 2012 Summer Olympics.

Career history
In the beginning of the 2008 season, Özgür Gürbulak transferred from Saran Anadolu team to Galatasaray, which became European champion.

Gürbulak won the silver medal with the national team at the 2009 IWBF European Championship held in Adana, Turkey, and became "Top Scorer" of the tournament. He was awarded also "All-Star Team" member.

He played in the national team, which ranked eight at the 2010 Wheelchair Basketball World Championship held in Birmingham, United Kingdom . He was the second top scorer of the championship with 23.13 average PPG following Reo Fujimoto (4.5) from Japan.

At the 2012 Summer Paralympics, the national team, he was part of, ranked 7th.

He won the silver medal again at the 2013 IWBF Men's European Championship held on June 26-July 8 in Frankfurt, Germany. He was also named to the "All-Star Team Men".

Achievements

Awards
Individual
 2009 IWBF European Championship -"Top Scorer"
 2009 IWBF European Championship -"All-Star Team"
 2013 IWBF Men's European Championship -"All-Star Team"
 2015 IWBF Men's European Championship -"All-Star Team"
 2017 IWBF Men's European Championship -"All-Star Team"

References

1981 births
Living people
Sportspeople from İzmir
Turkish men's wheelchair basketball players
Paralympic wheelchair basketball players of Turkey
Wheelchair basketball players at the 2012 Summer Paralympics
Wheelchair basketball players at the 2016 Summer Paralympics
Wheelchair basketball players at the 2020 Summer Paralympics
Forwards (basketball)
Galatasaray S.K. (wheelchair basketball) players